Echo Township is a civil township of Antrim County in the U.S. state of Michigan.  As of the 2010 census, the township population was 877.

Communities 

Geography

Demographics
As of the census of 2000, there were 928 people, 355 households, and 272 families residing in the township. There were 522 housing units at an average density of 15.0 per square mile (5.8/km2). The racial makeup of the township was 97.41% White, 0.11% African American, 1.08% Native American, and 1.40% from two or more races. Hispanic or Latino of any race were 0.22% of the population.

There were 355 households, out of which 30.7% had children under the age of 18 living with them, 66.5% were married couples living together, 5.6% had a female householder with no husband present, and 23.1% were non-families. 20.3% of all households were made up of individuals, and 7.9% had someone living alone who was 65 years of age or older.  The average household size was 2.61 and the average family size was 2.95.

In the township the population was spread out, with 26.1% under the age of 18, 7.0% from 18 to 24, 26.9% from 25 to 44, 27.5% from 45 to 64, and 12.5% who were 65 years of age or older.  The median age was 38 years. For every 100 females, there were 102.2 males.  For every 100 females age 18 and over, there were 100.6 males.

The median income for a household in the township was $36,406, and the median income for a family was $40,500. Males had a median income of $31,193 versus $20,272 for females. The per capita income for the township was $15,427.  About 7.0% of families and 8.6% of the population were below the poverty line, including 8.6% of those under age 18 and 11.5% of those age 65 or over.

References

Townships in Antrim County, Michigan
Townships in Michigan